The Olympus OM System was a line of 35mm single-lens reflex cameras, lenses and accessories sold by Olympus between 1972 and 2002. The system was introduced by Olympus in 1972. The range was designed by Yoshihisa Maitani, chief designer for Olympus, and his staff; OM stands for Olympus Maitani.

The nucleus of the system was a series of compact bodies divided into an advanced series and a later consumer-oriented series. The first model was the all-mechanical M-1 which, after pressure from Leica (which already had an M1 model), was renamed OM-1. At the same time the M system was renamed OM System. The camera included a full-aperture TTL Cadmium-sulphide (CdS) exposure meter, and a bayonet lens mount of relatively large diameter. By the end of the 1970s it was joined by the semi-automatic OM-2 and consumer-oriented OM-10. Olympus continued the naming pattern with the 'professional' OM-3 and OM-4, and the consumer-level OM-20, OM-30 and OM-40. The cameras were accompanied by a series of Zuiko-branded lenses, as well as a generous selection of accessories. The majority of OM bodies and lenses were manual-focus only; the OM-707 of 1986 was the only true autofocus model.

Camera models 

Olympus produced a wide variety of OM camera models over the years.  These were divided into two distinct series.  Cameras with single-digit model numbers were the 'professional' series, optimized for more advanced features and durability.  Two-digit (or more) model numbers, or letters, meant a 'consumer' camera designed for ease of use.

All the consumer-grade models were discontinued after 1992, since the market for manual-focus SLR cameras had declined greatly in favour of autofocus SLRs. The consumer line returned in 1997 with the Cosina-sourced OM-2000 model. Professional and advanced-amateur demand for the high-end models continued, and they were produced until 2002, along with the consumer-grade OM-2000.

Professional cameras

OM-1 

The Olympus OM-1 was a manually-operated 35 mm single-lens reflex camera forming the basis of the OM system in 1972. At first called the Olympus M-1, Leica disputed this designation and it was changed to OM-1. It was designed by a team led by Yoshihisa Maitani with a through-the-lens exposure meter controlling a needle visible in the viewfinder. It was noted for its reduction of size, weight and noise. One feature unique to the OM-1, compared to the rest of the OM system, was its mirror lock-up facility which made it ideal for astrophotography and macrophotography.

OM-2 

Introduced in 1975, the Olympus OM-2 was a semi-automatic, aperture-priority camera featuring an electronically controlled shutter. It was based on the OM-1 body, and retained compatibility with OM-1 accessories and lenses. It boasted automatic through-the-lens (TTL) off-the-film (OTF) metering, and exposure was considered very accurate. This was calculated by the measured light reflected off the surface of the shutter, and/or the film surface during the actual exposure. The camera also offered a manual-exposure mode, as in the OM-1. It also introduced the integration of electronic flash into the exposure system using the TTL exposure system.

OM-3 

The OM-3 was an updated version of the OM-1, a manual camera without automatic exposure modes, and an entirely mechanical shutter. It featured a multi-spot metering system (shared with the OM-4) in addition to the centre-weighted metering of the earlier body. It also featured an LCD similar to the OM-4 which could be illuminated in low light. Its main advantage over the OM-4 was its ability to operate without batteries due to its mechanical design. Batteries were only needed for the exposure meter and LCD. It lacked a self-timer and mirror lock-up functions, however.

In 1995, nine years after the OM-3 was discontinued, the OM-3Ti was released. It shared the improvements over the OM-3 that the OM-4Ti held over the OM-4.

OM-4 

The Olympus OM-4, an improved version of the OM-2, was manufactured from 1983 to 1987. It was introduced at a US$685 list price for the body alone. It was a battery-powered, electromechanically controlled, manual focus SLR with manual exposure control or aperture priority autoexposure. It used a horizontal cloth focal plane shutter with a speed range of 240s (in auto mode) to 1/2000s plus bulb, and flash X-sync of 1/60s.

The OM-4 featured a built-in spot meter [of a narrow acceptance angle, see Canon FTb] (2% of view; 3.3˚ with 50 mm lens) and was the first camera capable of measuring eight individual areas and averaging them. The light meter used a dual-concentric segmented silicon photo-diode to provide spot or centerweighted readings. It used a graduated linear LCD for the shutter speed at the bottom of the viewfinder to precisely indicate its readings versus the actual camera settings.

In 1986 the OM-4 was improved to a tougher OM-4Ti (OM-4T in USA) version, with titanium top and bottom plates, improved weatherproofing and high-speed flash sync. This last version was discontinued in 2002.

Consumer-grade cameras

OM-10 

The OM-10 hit the markets in June 1979 at the same time as the OM-2N.  The camera was a 35mm focal-plane shutter aperture priority AE SLR camera with an electronic shutter.  Only aperture-priority AE was available with the camera unless the optional manual exposure adapter was installed. This allowed the setting of shutter speeds between 1s and 1/1000s, (bulb mode was also available).  The camera was equipped with a fixed pentaprism viewfinder which contained an LED exposure indicator.  The finder coverage was measured to be 93%.

Exposure control was aperture priority AE using center-weighted light metering. Film speeds of the camera range from ASA 25 to ASA 1600. Film winding was done by using the film-wind lever located on the top right of the camera. Film rewinding was done manually using the film-rewind crank located at the top left.

OM-20 
The OM-20 (sold in the United States as the OM-G) was essentially a refinement of the OM-10, replacing that model's rather tricky mode switch with one that was easier to use. The OM-20 also had a built-in shutter-speed dial, a mode display in the view finder and a much stronger winding mechanism which permitted it to be used at 5 frames per second on the OM Motor Drive 2. The shutter magnet and release system had other minor design improvements.

OM-30 
Essentially an OM-20 with auto-focus capability. With a normal lens there were lights in the view finder to help the user with manual focusing.

When used with a motor drive or winder unit and the M-In Focus Trigger cord, the lens could be pre-focused on a specific point. As soon as an object moved into that focus zone the camera would trigger a shot.

A special motorised 35-70mm autofocus lens was also available at the time, but is now very rare.

OM-40 
A further refinement of the OM-20 with features that were more of interest to serious photographers. It had a lighter, slightly more modern and ergonomic body design. It also had an early form of matrix metering, and a mirror lock-up facility. This was activated when the self-timer was switched on, a feature still rarely found in non-high-end cameras.

Also known in some markets as the OM-PC, the OM-40 had a program mode that automated the selection of both the aperture and the shutter speed.

OM-2000 
An Olympus model made by Cosina, the OM-2000 was not considered by Olympus 'die-hard fans' to be a 'true OM' camera.

The OM-2000 had a mechanical, vertical-running shutter in contrast to the traditional OM cameras with their horizontal-running shutter.  This allowed the OM-2000 to synchronize an electronic flash at 1/125s.  Many photographers found this capability an advantage for the use of "fill flash" in daylight.

Prototype cameras

OM-X 

During development, the Olympus design team led by Yoshihisa Maitani worked on a completely modular set of units called the MDN (Maitani-Darkbox-Normal), which resembled a 35 mm Hasselblad. This camera was built as a prototype, and is sometimes referred to as the OM-X. A more conventional camera which integrated the shutter, film transport, mirror and viewfinder was called the MDS (Maitani-Darkbox-Simple). The MDS developed into what became the OM-1.

Lenses 

The OM Series lenses had the aperture control ring located at the front of the lens barrel. This was done to move it away from the shutter speed control, which was a ring on the camera body concentric with the lens mount. OM lenses also featured a depth-of-field preview button on the lens, in contrast to most other SLR camera systems, in which the button was placed on the camera body.

The OM lens was designed to sit 46 mm (measured from the lens mounting ring, or flange) from the film plane. The combination of on-lens aperture control and the generous 'flange focal distance' make OM lenses adaptable (with limited functionality) to a variety of other camera systems – including Canon EOS models – by using a mount-specific adapter.

Prototype lenses 
Manual Zuiko lenses that were never marketed:

 18 mm/f3.5, prototype of 18 mm/f3.5, L.zuiko with 12 elements 10 group, fixed 72 mm thread
 50 mm/f2 pancake, prototype of 40 mm/f2 pancake
 85 mm/f1.4, prototype, with GRIN (GRadient INdex of Refraction) elements
 160 mm/f3.5, prototype
 300 mm/f6.3, prototype
 400 mm/f4.5, prototype
 500 mm/f5.6, prototype
 800 mm/f9, prototype
 1200 mm/f14, prototype
 24–40 mm/f4, prototype
 90–250 mm prototype of 85–250/5

Accessories 

Being a system, Olympus made numerous accessories for professional portrait, photo journalism, sport photography and scientific photography.
 motor drives and exchangeable camera back for 250 exposures
 lighting: dedicated flashes, shoes, cords, connectors, power sources, adapters and filters
 interchangeable focusing screens instead of bulkier exchangeable finders
 macrophotography: extension tubes, stands & bases, lightings and accessories
 microphotography: systems and connecting, focusing, automatic and manual exposure units
 technical photography: data recording backs, endoscope and astrophotography adapters
 cases, grips, cable release, battery holders

See also 
 Four Thirds System
 Micro Four Thirds system, a derivative of the Four Thirds system specifically geared to digital mirrorless interchangeable-lens cameras (MILCs)
 Olympus OM-D series, the 2012 resurrection of the Olympus OM System

References

External links

 Olympus Chronology Olympus Corporation history page.

OM system
Lens mounts